= Bryanston West, Gauteng =

Bryanston West
- Location within Gauteng Location within South Africa
- Coordinates: 26°04′43″S 28°01′02″E
- Country: South Africa
- Province: Gauteng
- Municipality: City of Johannesburg

Area
  - Total: 0.18 km^{2} (0.069 sq mi)

Population (2001)
  - Total: 153
  - Density: 850/km^{2} (2,200/sq mi)
- Time zone: UTC+2 (SAST)
- Postal code (street): 2191
- PO box: 2060

Bryanston West is a suburb of Johannesburg, South Africa. It is located in Region B of the City of Johannesburg Metropolitan Municipality.
